XHSAP-FM is a radio station in Agua Prieta, Sonora. Broadcasting on 98.5 FM, XHSAP is owned by Grupo Radiofónico ZER and is known as La Tremenda.

History
The concession for XHSAP was awarded on August 31, 1993. The station has always been owned by Zermeño.

References

Spanish-language radio stations
Radio stations in Sonora